State Route 189 (SR 189) is a  state highway in Coffee and Crenshaw counties, in Alabama, United States, that serves as a connection between Kinston, Elba and Brantley. SR 189 intersects SR 52 at its southern terminus and US 331 at its northern terminus.

Route description
SR 189 begins at its intersection with SR 52 in the central business district of Kinston. From this terminus, the route travels in an easterly direction prior to turning to the north as it exits the town. From this point, SR 189 generally travels in a north-northeast direction where it intersects both SR 134 and SR 141 en route to Elba. Within Elba, the route turns north in a concurrency with SR 203 and joins US 84 on the west side of the town. Upon leaving their brief concurrency with US 84, SR 189 and 203 turn north and east in a bypass of Elba. SR 189 then leaves SR 203 and generally travels in a northwesterly direction en route to its northern terminus at US 331 south of Brantley.

Major intersections

See also

References

External links

189
Transportation in Coffee County, Alabama
Transportation in Crenshaw County, Alabama